Douglas Greenall (7 June 1927 – 23 December 2007) was an English professional rugby league footballer who played in the 1940s, 1950s and 1960s, and coached in the 1960s.

Background
Doug Greenall was born in St Helens, Lancashire, England, he was the landlord (with his wife Vera (née Campbell)) of the Talbot Alehouse, 97 Duke Street, St Helens, and he died aged 80 in St. Helens, Merseyside, England.

Playing career

International honours
Doug Greenall, won caps for England while at St. Helens in 1951 against France, in 1952 against Other Nationalities, Wales, in 1953 against France (2 matches), Other Nationalities, and won caps for Great Britain while at St. Helens in 1951 against New Zealand (3 matches), in 1952 against Australia (2 matches), and in 1954 against New Zealand.

Doug Greenall also represented Great Britain in two non-Test matches while at St. Helens in the 12-22 defeat by France at Parc des Princes, Paris on 22 May 1952, and the 17-22 defeat by France at Stade de Gerland, Lyon on 24 May 1953.

Doug Greenall played left-, i.e. number 4 for English League XIII while at St Helens in the 8-26 defeat by France on Saturday 22 November 1958 at Knowsley Road, St. Helens.

Challenge Cup Final appearances
Doug Greenall played right-, i.e. number 3, and was captain in St Helens' 10-15 defeat by Huddersfield in the 1952–53 Challenge Cup Final during the 1952–53 season at Wembley Stadium, London on Saturday 25 April 1953, in front of a crowd of 89,588, and played right-, i.e. number 3, in the 13-2 victory over Halifax in the 1955–56 Challenge Cup Final during the 1955–56 season at Wembley Stadium, London on Saturday 28 April 1956, in front of a crowd of 79,341.

County Cup Final appearances
Doug Greenall played right-, i.e. number 3, in St. Helens' 5-22 defeat by Leigh in the 1952–53 Lancashire County Cup Final during the 1952–53 season at Station Road, Swinton on Saturday 29 November 1952, played right-, i.e. number 3, in the 16-8 victory over Wigan in the 1953–54 Lancashire County Cup Final during the 1953–54 season at Station Road, Swinton on Saturday 24 October 1953, played right-, i.e. number 3, in the 3-10 defeat by Oldham in the 1956–57 Lancashire County Cup Final during the 1956–57 season at Central Park, Wigan on Saturday 20 October 1956, played right-, i.e. number 3, in the 2-12 defeat by Oldham in the 1958–59 Lancashire County Cup Final during the 1958–59 season at Station Road, Swinton Saturday 25 October 1958, and played right-, i.e. number 3, in  the 5-4 defeat by Warrington in the 1959–60 Lancashire County Cup Final during the 1959–60 season at Central Park, Wigan Saturday 31 October 1959.

Testimonial match
Doug Greenall's Testimonial match at St. Helens took place against Halifax in 1952.

Honoured at St Helens R.F.C.
Doug Greenall is a St Helens R.F.C. Hall of Fame inductee.

Coaching

References

External links
Profile at saints.org.uk
(archived by archive.is) U.K. League Hooker in Doubt
Statistics at wigan.rlfans.com

1927 births
2007 deaths
Bradford Bulls coaches
Bradford Bulls players
England national rugby league team players
English rugby league coaches
English rugby league players
Great Britain national rugby league team players
Lancashire rugby league team players
Liverpool City coaches
Place of death missing
Rugby league centres
Rugby league players from Prescot
St Helens R.F.C. captains
St Helens R.F.C. players
Wigan Warriors players